Fat Man is the codename for the atomic bomb that was detonated over the Japanese city of Nagasaki by the United States on August 9, 1945.

Fat Man or Fatman may also refer to:

People
 Fats Domino, or "the Fat Man", rock and roll singer
 George Sanger (musician), or "the Fat Man", American video game music composer
 Kevin Smith, film director who uses "Fatman" as an online persona and vlog brand
 Tom Vernon, or "Fat Man", British broadcaster and travelogue writer
 Dave "Fat Man" Williams, American jazz, blues, and rhythm & blues pianist, bandleader, singer, and songwriter

Arts and entertainment

Characters
 Fatman, in  the video game The Adventures of Fatman
 Fatman, the Batman imitator character
 "The fat man" or Kasper Gutman, played by Sydney Greenstreet in the 1941 film The Maltese Falcon
 Fatman or Jason McCabe, in the television series Jake and the Fatman, played by William Conrad
 Fatman the Human Flying Saucer, a comic book superhero created in the 1960s
 Fatman (Metal Gear), in the video game Metal Gear Solid 2
 Hiram Worchester or Fatman, in the Wild Cards science fiction book series
 Fatman the Mister America comic book character sidekick.
 Peter Griffin in the TV series Family Guy, who is called "The Fat Man" by his son Stewie

Film and television 
 The Fat Man (film), a 1951 film
 Fatman (2020 film), a film starring Mel Gibson
 Fatman (upcoming film), a Pakistani Urdu-language superhero film
 The Fat Man (radio), a radio detective show

Music 
 "The Fat Man" (song), a 1949 Fats Domino song
 "Fat Man", a 1969 song by Jethro Tull from Stand Up
 "Fat Man", a 1971 song by Nazareth from Nazareth
 "Fatman", a song by Icehouse from Icehouse

Other uses 
 Fatman Mountain, Montana, United States
 FaTMAN, the Fife and Tayside Metropolitan Area (computer) Network
 Gippsland GA200 or GA200 Fatman, an agricultural aircraft

See also

 Obesity
 Fat Boy (disambiguation)
 Fatman Scoop (born 1971), hip hop artist from Brooklyn, New York
 Thin Man (disambiguation)